Saw Maung (5 December 1928 – 24 July 1997) was a Burmese army general and statesman who served as Chairman of the State Law and Order Restoration Council (SLORC) in Myanmar and Prime Minister of Burma from 1988 to 1992. Beside this, he was the 8th Commander-in-Chief of the Tatmadaw. He is the first one to get the rank of Senior General which was created for him in 1990.

Early life and career
He was born on 5 December 1928 in Mandalay, British Burma. Saw Maung joined the army in 1945, three years before the country gained independence from Britain, and received a commission in 1952. From 1974 to 1976, he fought against communist insurgents and ethnic rebels along the border with Thailand. In 1976, he became a brigadier general, and in 1981 an adjutant-general. He became armed forces commander in 1983.

Saw Maung was army chief of staff and defence minister in the brief government of Sein Lwin and became chairman of the junta when the army staged its coup in 1988 after the 8888 Uprising. He was effective ruler of the country as head of the State Law and Order Restoration Council (SLORC). He also held the posts of prime minister and minister of foreign affairs. As a high-ranking member of the Burma Socialist Programme Party (BSPP), he provided continuity of leadership during a succession of short-lived predecessors that followed the toppling of Ne Win earlier in 1988.

Chairman of SLORC
Saw Maung assumed responsibility as chairman of the newly formed SLORC on 18 September 1988, replacing the BSPP and promised multi-party elections to follow soon. He publicly stated that he would hand over power to the winning party and would have the army return to the barracks; where in his own words they "rightfully belonged". This proved to be too much for hardliners in the military and loyalists of Ne Win. SLORC held free elections in 1990. The 1990 parliamentary elections were won by the National League for Democracy (NLD) led by Aung San Suu Kyi, but SLORC did not accept the results in a clear sign of Saw Maung's authority being undermined.

Saw Maung resigned as chairman of SLORC in April 1992. According to the junta this was for health reasons. However, this was the result of Saw Maung being sedated, isolated and quietly removed from power in a palace coup, after which it was widely reported that Saw Maung was actually suffering from a nervous breakdown and believed himself to be the reincarnation of an 11th-century warrior-king. This was in fact a plot by his successor General Than Shwe and other hardliners to justify the takeover and cement his control. Some believe that Saw Maung's decision to hand over power to Aung San Suu Kyi's National League for Democracy was too much for other generals who also had the consent from Ne Win to carry out the palace coup.

Saw Maung died of a heart attack at 69 on 24 July 1997.

Family and personal life
He married Daw Aye Yee who died on 25 December 2004. He is succeeded by his three children; two sons and a daughter, and three grandchildren.

Saw Maung was also a golfer and a devout Buddhist.

References

 Burma Library Biography
 Burma Library Biography

1928 births
1997 deaths
Foreign ministers of Myanmar
Defence ministers of Myanmar
Government ministers of Myanmar
People from Mandalay
Burma Socialist Programme Party politicians
Leaders who took power by coup
Burmese Buddhists
Recipients of the Alinkar Kyawswar